Blodget is a surname. Notable people with the surname include:

Dudley Blodget (1820–1856), American politician
Henry Blodget (born 1966), American businessman, investor, and journalist
Lorin Blodget (1823–1901), American physicist and writer

See also
Blodgett (surname)